This is the draw for the 2008 XL Bermuda Open doubles competition. Marcelo Melo and André Sá were the defending champions, but did not participate.

Seeds

Key
 WC = Wild card
 Alt = Alternate
 w/o = Walkover
 r = Retired

Draw

2008 ATP Challenger Series
Tennis in Bermuda